This is a list of Brown Bears football players in the NFL Draft.

Key

Selections

Undrafted players
Note: No drafts held before 1920

References

Brown

Brown Bears NFL Draft